Asbury is an unincorporated community located on Sand Mountain in eastern Marshall County, Alabama, United States. It is located about nine miles east of the county seat of Guntersville. The community was named after a Methodist church, which was named for one of the first Methodist Episcopal Church bishops, Francis Asbury.

Demographics
According to the returns from 1850-2010 for Alabama, it has never reported a population figure separately on the U.S. Census.

References

Unincorporated communities in Alabama
Unincorporated communities in Marshall County, Alabama